Nothris leuca is a moth in the family Gelechiidae. It was described by Filipjev in 1928. It is found in Mongolia.

References

Chelariini
Moths described in 1928